"Feel the Love Go" is a song by Scottish indie rock band Franz Ferdinand. It was released on 8 January 2018 as the second single from the band's fifth studio album, Always Ascending (2018). The song was cut down to a shorter length for airplay, as with the previous single "Always Ascending".

Background and release
The band recorded the album at RAK Studios in London and Motorbass Studios in Paris. The song debuted on Zane Lowe's Beats 1 show on 8 January 2018 and was released as a download and on streaming services the same day.

Music video
The song received a music video directed by Diane Martel who had previously directed the band's music videos for "Do You Want To" and "Evil Eye". It stars band frontman Alex Kapranos as a zany faith healer. It was originally made exclusively available to watch via Apple Music, but was eventually uploaded to YouTube on 21 January 2018.

Track listing

Charts

References

Franz Ferdinand (band) songs
2018 singles
2018 songs
Domino Recording Company singles
Songs written by Bob Hardy (bassist)
Songs written by Alex Kapranos
Songs written by Paul Thomson
Songs written by Miaoux Miaoux